Omnicron Conspiracy is a 1989 video game published by Epyx in the United States and by Image Works in the UK and German markets.

Gameplay
Omnicron Conspiracy is a game in which a graphic adventure stars Ace Powers, Intergalactic Star Policeman Extraordinaire.

Reception
Dennis Owens reviewed the game for Computer Gaming World, and stated that "Omnicron Conspiracy, because of its logical puzzles, ease of interaction, and humorous (sometimes, downright sweet, small touches), can certainly be recommended. It makes an interesting change of pace and offers an entertaining story for anyone who likes graphic adventures."

Reviews
Computer and Video Games - Dec, 1989
CU Amiga - Nov, 1990
ACE (Advanced Computer Entertainment) - Dec, 1989
Amiga Action - Dec, 1989
ASM (Aktueller Software Markt) - Dec, 1989
ST Format - Jan, 1991

References

1989 video games
Adventure games
Amiga games
Atari ST games
DOS games
Epyx games
First Star Software games
Science fiction video games
Video games about police officers
Video games developed in the United States
Video games set in outer space
Video games set in the future